Sotiris Chamos (born 15 December 1993) is a Greek professional footballer who plays as a midfielder for PO Elassona.

Career 
Chamos was born on December 15, 1993, in Elassona, a town and a municipality in the Larissa regional unit in Greece. He began his career from the youth team of his hometown, P.O.E. He has also played for Niki Volos, Tilikratis and for Oikonomos Tsaritsani, (teams of lower National Categories), until August 2015, when he made a major step to his career signing for AE Larissa, under the recommendation of his coach Ratko Dostanić. On 1 February 2016 Chamos was given on loan to Gamma Ethniki club Pydna Kitros until the end of the season.

References

External links
a-sports.gr
myplayer
Oikonomos FC
larissasportnews.gr (Interview)

1993 births
Living people
Greek footballers
Athlitiki Enosi Larissa F.C. players
Niki Volos F.C. players
People from Elassona
Association football midfielders
Footballers from Thessaly